Gabrielle Michele Spiegel (born January 20, 1943) is an American historian of medieval France, and the current Krieger-Eisenhower Professor of History at Johns Hopkins University where she served as chair for the history department for six years, and acting and interim dean of faculty. She also served as dean of humanities at the University of California, Los Angeles in 2004–2005, and, from 2008 to 2009, she was the president of the American Historical Association. In 2011, she was elected as a fellow to the American Academy of Arts and Sciences.

Education

Spiegel received a Bachelor of Arts from Bryn Mawr College in 1964. The next year, she completed a Master of Arts in teaching at Harvard University. She received her PhD in 1974 from Johns Hopkins University.

Career

Spiegel began her lecturing at her alma mater, Bryn Mawr, from 1972 to 1973. In 1974, she taught as an assistant professor at the University of Maryland, where she stayed until 1992 (having been made an associate professor in 1979 and a full professor in 1992). During her time at the University of Maryland, she held fellowships with the Center for Advanced Study in the Behavioral Sciences at Stanford, the John Simon Guggenheim Memorial Foundation and the Rockefeller Residency Program in Atlantic History at Johns Hopkins.

Spiegel has been a full professor at Johns Hopkins since 1993, where she has served as chair of the history department from 1999 to 2002 and from 2005 to 2008. During her time at JHU, she has twice served as directeur d'Etudes associé at the Ecole des Hautes Etudes en Sciences Sociales. In 2011, she was named a Gilman scholar.

Spiegel's commitment to the historical profession and post-secondary teaching is well evidenced by her years of service on the American Historical Association and in university administration at Johns Hopkins. Before her election as president to the AHA in 2007, she had served as vice-president (research division) from 2000 to 2003. While chair of the history department at JHU, she also served as dean of faculty from 2005 to 2007 and returned to those duties once again as interim dean in 2010. She has supervised the completion of seventeen PhDs by her graduate students at JHU and continues to teach both graduate- and undergraduate-level courses on medieval history and historiography.

Work
Spiegel's work focuses on the theory and practice of historiography, both in the Middle Ages and in the modern era. Her publications on these topics include The Chronicle Tradition of Saint‐Denis: A Survey (1978), Romancing the Past: The Rise of Vernacular Prose Historiography in Thirteenth-Century France (1993), The Past as Text: The Theory and Practice of Medieval Historiography (1997), and Practicing History: New Directions in Historical Writing after the Linguistic Turn (2005), as well as some sixty articles on medieval historiography and contemporary theories of historical writing. Many of her articles and books have been translated into other languages such as Japanese, French, German, Italian, Hungarian, Spanish and Chinese.

Her best known theoretical work is "History, Historicism and the Social Logic of the Text in the Middle Ages," published in the academic journal, Speculum, in 1990. In this article, Spiegel addresses the challenges that the linguistic turn poses to the historical profession and offers the "social logic of the text" as an interpretive lens that locates written sources within the social, political and economic currents that shaped the discourse of the moment while simultaneously foregrounding the active nature of the author’s work as he seeks to reconstitute and reshape reality as he writes. Her 1993 monograph, Romancing the Past: The Rise of Vernacular Prose Historiography in Thirteenth-Century France sought to demonstrate the utility of such an approach to historical sources.

Research awards and honours
 Elected fellow, American Academy of Arts and Sciences, 2011.
 Named Gilman Scholar, Johns Hopkins University, 2011.
 Elected President, American Historical Association, 2008–2009.
 Appointed Krieger-Eisenhower University Professor (of History), Johns Hopkins University, 2003.
 Elected Vice-President for Research Division, American Historical Association, 2000–2003.
 Elected fellow, Medieval Academy of America, 1996.
 Berkshire Conference of Women Historians' Article Prize for "History, Historicism and the Social Logic of the Text in the Middle Ages," 1989–1990.
 William Koren, Jr. Prize for Best Article on French History from Society for French Historical Studies for "Social Change and Literary Language: The Textualization of the Past in Thirteenth-Century Old French Historiography," 1988.
 Fellowship, John Simon Guggenheim Foundation, 1988.
 Phi Beta Kappa, Johns Hopkins University, 1974.

Selected works

Books
 The Chronicle Tradition of Saint-Denis: A Survey (Leiden and Boston: Medieval Classics: Texts and Studies, no. 10,  1978). OCLC 715597893
 Romancing the Past: The Rise of Vernacular Prose Historiography in Thirteenth-Century France, (Berkeley and Los Angeles: University of California Press, 1993). 
 The Past as Text: The Theory and Practice of Medieval Historiography (Baltimore: Johns Hopkins Press, 1997). 
 Practicing History: New Directions in Historical Writing after the Linguistic Turn, edited with an introduction (London: Routledge, 2005).

Translations
 -- with Stephen Nichols, Kantorowicz: Stories of a Historian (Baltimore and London: Johns Hopkins Press, 2001).

Articles
 
 
 
 
 
 
 "History as Enlightenment: Suger and the Mos Anagogicus," in Abbot Suger and the Abbey Church of Saint-Denis, ed. Paula Gerson, Metropolitan Museum of Art, NY, 1986, pp. 17–27.
 
 "Social Change and Literary Language: The Textualization of the Past in Thirteenth-Century French Historiography," Journal of Medieval and Renaissance Studies, 17 (1987): 129–148.
 
 
 
 
 
 
 "Historical Thought in Medieval Europe," in Lloyd Kramer and Sarah Maza, eds., A Companion to Western Historical Thought, (Oxford, 2002): 78–98.
 
 
 "The Task of the Historian (American Historical Association Presidential Address), American Historical Review (February 2009): 1–14.

References

External links 
 AHA Presidential Address:  "The Task of the Historian" (Site includes an image and biographic information)

Johns Hopkins University faculty
American medievalists
Women medievalists
Bryn Mawr College alumni
Harvard Graduate School of Education alumni
Johns Hopkins University alumni
University of Maryland, College Park faculty
Living people
1943 births
American women historians
Fellows of the Medieval Academy of America
21st-century American women